Lea Polonsky (born 25 May 2002) is an Israeli swimmer. She competed in the women's 200 metre freestyle event at the 2020 European Aquatics Championships, in Budapest, Hungary.

She represented Israel at the 2022 World Aquatics Championships held in Budapest, Hungary. She reached the semifinals in the women's 200 metre butterfly event and she also competed in the women's 200 metre individual medley where she did not advance to the semifinals. She also competed in several relay events.

Her older brother Ron Polonsky is a swimmer as well, and he competed for Israel at the 2020 Tokyo Olympics.

References

External links
Lea Polonsky at California Golden Bears

2002 births
Living people
Israeli female swimmers
Israeli female butterfly swimmers
Israeli female freestyle swimmers
Place of birth missing (living people)
Swimmers at the 2018 Summer Youth Olympics
California Golden Bears women's swimmers
21st-century Israeli women